Georges L. Dumont (June 25, 1898 – July 4, 1966) was a physician and political figure in New Brunswick, Canada. He represented Restigouche County in the Legislative Assembly of New Brunswick as a Liberal member from 1960 to 1966.

He was born in Saint-Anselme, Quebec, the son of Gregoire Dumont and Gracieuse Boucher. Dumont was educated at the Université Laval. In 1923, he married Elizabeth St. Pierre. Dumont served as Minister of Health in the province's Executive Council from 1960 until his death in 1966.

The Dr. Georges-L.-Dumont University Hospital Centre in Moncton was named in his honour.

References 
 Canadian Parliamentary Guide, 1965, PG Normandin

1898 births
1966 deaths
New Brunswick Liberal Association MLAs
Place of death missing
Université Laval alumni